Ivo Kesselring Carotini (born 16 February 1942) is a Brazilian water polo player. He competed at the 1964 Summer Olympics and the 1968 Summer Olympics.

His brother was Paulo Carotini.

References

External links
 
 

1942 births
Living people
Brazilian male water polo players
Olympic water polo players of Brazil
Water polo players at the 1964 Summer Olympics
Water polo players at the 1968 Summer Olympics
Water polo players from São Paulo
20th-century Brazilian people